Dandré van der Westhuizen (born 6 November 1991 in Pretoria, South Africa) is a South African rugby union player, who most recently played with the . He can play as a loosehead or tighthead prop.

Career

Blue Bulls / TUT Vikings

After finishing high school in 2009, Van der Westhuizen joined the Blue Bulls Academy. He represented the  side in the 2010 Under-19 Provincial Championship, scoring one try in their match against the s to help them finish second on the log.

In the second half of 2011, he made a single appearance for eventual champions the s during the 2011 Under-21 Provincial Championship.

He played in all seven of the ' matches during the 2012 Varsity Cup, but saw his side relegated after losing all their matches.

Golden Lions / Falcons

He made a further two starts for the Falcons as they finished in seventh place on the log.

He was named in the Falcons squad for the 2013 Vodacom Cup competition, but failed to get any game time. He did return to action during the 2013 Currie Cup First Division, starting seven of their matches and playing off the bench on three occasions. The Falcons finished last on the log after winning just two out of their fourteen matches.

He represented the Falcons in the Vodacom Cup competition for the first time in 2014, making four appearances. He played in three of the Falcons' matches during the 2014 Currie Cup qualification series; a spot in the 2014 Currie Cup Premier Division was up for grabs for the winner of the series, but the Falcons missed out to remain in the First Division. Van der Westhuizen started all five of their matches in the First Division regular season to help them finish in fourth spot to qualify for the semi-finals. He also started their semi-final, helping the Falcons cause an upset by beating the log leaders  in Potchefstroom and advance to the final.

Squads

Van der Westhuizen was a member of the following squads:

References

South African rugby union players
Living people
1991 births
Rugby union players from Pretoria
Rugby union props
Blue Bulls players
Falcons (rugby union) players
Tshwane University of Technology alumni